Lubambo Musonda (born 1 March 1995) is a Zambian professional footballer who plays as a left winger for Danish 1st Division club AC Horsens and the Zambia national team.

Club career
Musonda has played for National Assembly, Power Dynamos and Ulisses.

Following the 2015 Africa Cup of Nations, Musonda went on trial with FC Aktobe.

In August 2015 Musonda signed for Gandzasar Kapan.

On 19 January 2019, Śląsk Wrocław announced the signing of Musonda on a one-and-a-half year contract, with the option to extend the contract for two additional years. After two and a half years in Poland, Musonda joined Danish 1st Division club AC Horsens on 16 August 2021, signing a deal until June 2024.

International career
At the youth level he played in the 2015 African U-20 Championship, scoring against Mozambique in its qualifiers, and the 2015 Africa U-23 Cup of Nations.

Musonda made his senior international debut for Zambia in 2014. In December 2014 he was named as part of Zambia's preliminary squad for the 2015 Africa Cup of Nations.

Career statistics

Club

International

Scores and results list Zambia's goal tally first, score column indicates score after each Musonda goal.

Honours
Gandzasar
Armenian Cup: 2017–18

References

External links
 

1995 births
Living people
Zambian footballers
Zambian expatriate footballers
Zambia international footballers
Zambia under-20 international footballers
Association football wingers
Sportspeople from Lusaka
2015 Africa Cup of Nations players
2015 Africa U-23 Cup of Nations players
National Assembly F.C. players
Power Dynamos F.C. players
Ulisses FC players
FC Gandzasar Kapan players
Śląsk Wrocław players
AC Horsens players
Armenian Premier League players
Ekstraklasa players
II liga players
Zambian expatriate sportspeople in Armenia
Expatriate footballers in Armenia
Expatriate footballers in Poland
Expatriate men's footballers in Denmark
Zambian expatriate sportspeople in Poland
Zambian expatriate sportspeople in Denmark